Abene is a surname. Notable people with the surname include:

Mark Abene (born 1972), American computer security expert and entrepreneur
Mike Abene (born 1942), American jazz pianist

See also
Aben (disambiguation)
Abéné, village in Senegal